Davide Caremi (born 5 May 1984) is an Italian footballer who plays as a midfielder. From 2003 to 2011 he had played 78 Serie B games; between January to June 2005, 2005–06, 2007–08 and 2011–12 Caremi also played 76 times in Serie C1.

On 18 June 2012 he was banned from all football activity for 3 years and 6 months due to involvement in the 2011–12 Italian football scandal.

Career

Como
Born in Como, Lombardy, Caremi started his career at hometown club Calcio Como SpA. He made Serie B debut on 16 November 2003 against Atalanta. The club relegated at the end of season, which Caremi formed an agreement with the club regarding wages, however it became a controversy few years later, as the agreement made Como eligible to 2004–05 Serie C1 by a "healthier" financial status. Como relegated again in June 2005 and was declared bankrupted on 22 December 2004.

Pescara
In 2004 Caremi was signed by Chievo but farmed to Serie B club Pescara on 31 August 2004 in co-ownership deal for €500. In January 2005 he left for Serie C1 club Novara. In June 2005 Chievo gave up the remain 50% registration rights to Pescara for free. In 2005 Caremi left for another third division club S.S. Lanciano. Caremi was included in 2005 pre-season camp of Pescara.

AlbinoLeffe
In 2006 Chievo re-signed Caremi for €100,000. He was immediately left for AlbinoLeffe in another co-ownership deal for €70,000 in 3-year deal. Caremi only played 13 times in 2006–07 Serie B. In June 2007 the co-ownership was renewed. On 1 August 2007 he was signed by Ancona. In June 2008 Chievo gave up the 50% registration rights again for free.

Frosinone
On 9 July 2009 Caremi was signed by Frosinone in 2-year deal.

Andria
On 15 July 2011 Caremi joined Andria. He was released on 28 October.

Italian football scandal
Caremi was interrogated by a procurator on 7 March 2012. On 18 June 2012 FIGC announced that Caremi was responsible in 2011–12 Italian football scandal, which he would banned from all football activities for  years. He appealed to FIGC's Corte di Giustizia Federale, and later CONI's Tribunale Nazionale di Arbitrato per lo Sport, however both appeal were dismissed.

References

External links
 Lega Serie B profile 
 AIC profile (data by football.it) 

Italian footballers
Como 1907 players
Delfino Pescara 1936 players
Novara F.C. players
S.S. Virtus Lanciano 1924 players
U.C. AlbinoLeffe players
A.C. Ancona players
Frosinone Calcio players
S.S. Fidelis Andria 1928 players
Serie B players
Serie C players
Italy youth international footballers
Association football midfielders
Sportspeople from Como
1984 births
Living people
Footballers from Lombardy